Song of the Road may refer to:

 The Song of the Road, a 1937 British film directed by John Baxter
 Pather Panchali, a 1955 Indian film directed by Satyajit Ray often known by this title in English